Players and pairs who neither have high enough rankings nor receive wild cards may participate in a qualifying tournament held one week before the annual Wimbledon Tennis Championships.

Seeds

  Shinobu Asagoe (qualifying competition)
  Patricia Wartusch (qualifying competition)
  Anikó Kapros (first round)
  Milagros Sequera (first round)
  Sarah Taylor (first round)
  Cho Yoon-jeong (qualifying competition)
  Julia Vakulenko (first round)
  Els Callens (qualified)
  Iveta Benešová (qualified)
  Antonella Serra Zanetti (qualified)
  Mashona Washington (first round)
  Sandra Kleinová (first round)
  Evgenia Kulikovskaya (qualifying competition)
  Kristie Boogert (first round)
  Roberta Vinci (qualified)
  Tatiana Perebiynis (qualified)
  Hsieh Su-wei (second round)
  Laura Granville (qualified)
  Alena Vašková (second round)
  Zuzana Ondrášková (qualified)
  Dally Randriantefy (second round)
  Alexandra Fusai (qualified)
  Ľubomíra Kurhajcová (first round)
  Liezel Huber (second round)

Qualifiers

  Alexandra Fusai
  Tatiana Perebiynis
  Roberta Vinci
  Zuzana Ondrášková
  Elena Tatarkova
  Myriam Casanova
  María Sánchez Lorenzo
  Els Callens
  Iveta Benešová
  Antonella Serra Zanetti
  María Vento-Kabchi
  Laura Granville

Qualifying draw

First qualifier

Second qualifier

Third qualifier

Fourth qualifier

Fifth qualifier

Sixth qualifier

Seventh qualifier

Eighth qualifier

Ninth qualifier

Tenth qualifier

Eleventh qualifier

Twelfth qualifier

External links

2002 Wimbledon Championships on WTAtennis.com
2002 Wimbledon Championships – Women's draws and results at the International Tennis Federation

Women's Singles Qualifying
Wimbledon Championship by year – Women's singles qualifying
Wimbledon Championships